New Astronomy is a peer-reviewed scientific journal covering topics in astronomy and astrophysics. The journal was established in 1996 and is currently published by Elsevier.

Abstracting and indexing
The journal is abstracted and indexed in the following databases:
Current Contents/Physics, Chemical, & Earth Sciences
INSPEC
SCISEARCH
Science Citation Index
Scopus

According to the Journal Citation Reports, the journal has a 2020 impact factor of 1.325.

References

External links
 

Astronomy journals
Elsevier academic journals
English-language journals
Publications established in 1996